is a Japanese master of aikido. He is a grandson of Morihei Ueshiba, founder of aikido, and son of Kisshomaru Ueshiba. Ueshiba is the third and current Doshu (hereditary head) of the Aikikai.

Biography
Ueshiba was born on April 2, 1951, in Tokyo, Japan. Recalling his childhood during a 2004 interview, he said, "The first time I wore an Aikido uniform I was in the first grade of elementary school. But my family didn’t force me to do keiko (training) then, I just did it when I felt like it. I started training seriously in my high school years. My intention then was to become a successor to my father, and to preserve Kaiso’s [Morihei Ueshiba's] legacy for the future."

In 1976, Ueshiba graduated from Meiji Gakuin University with a degree in economics. In 1996, he assumed the position of Dojocho (director/owner) of Aikikai Hombu Dojo. In 1997, he visited Ireland. He assumed the title of Doshu on January 4, 1999, following the death of his father, Kisshomaru Ueshiba. In January 2006, as part of Aiki-Kai Australia's 40th anniversary, Ueshiba visited and taught in Australia.

Ueshiba wrote the books Best Aikido: The fundamentals (2002, co-authored with his father Kisshomaru Ueshiba), The Aikido master course: Best Aikido 2 (2003), and Progressive Aikido: The essential elements (2005).

Following the iemoto system, he is expected to be succeeded as Doshu by his son Mitsuteru Ueshiba.

References

External links
 46th All Japan Aikido Demonstration Program, featuring Moriteru Ueshiba

 

Living people
1951 births
Japanese aikidoka
Martial arts writers
People from Tokyo
Meiji Gakuin University alumni